Pseudospingus is a genus of  warbler-like birds in the tanager family Thraupidae. They are found in highland forests in South America.

Taxonomy and species list
The two species now placed in this genus were formerly assigned to the genus Hemispingus. A molecular phylogenetic study published in 2014 found that Hemispingus was polyphyletic and as part of the subsequent rearrangement, the genus Pseudospingus was resurrected for these two species. The genus had been introduced by Hans von Berlepsch and Jean Stolzmann in 1896. The type species was subsequently designated as the drab hemispingus. The name Pseudospingus combines the Ancient Greek pseudos meaning "false" or "another" with spingos meaning "finch".

Species
The two species in the genus are:

References

 
Bird genera
Taxa named by Hans von Berlepsch
Taxa named by Jan Sztolcman